The National Health Service (Wales) Act 2006 (c 42) is an Act of the Parliament of the United Kingdom. It consolidates legislation relating to the National Health Service.

Part 1

Section 1 - Welsh Ministers' duty to promote health service
Sections 1(1) and (2) replace the corresponding provisions in section 1(1) of the National Health Service Act 1977. Section 1(3) replaces section 1(2) of that Act.

Section 5
This section gives effect to Schedule 1.

Section 6A
This section was inserted by regulation 5 of the National Health Service (Reimbursement of the Cost of EEA Treatment) Regulations 2010 (SI 2010/915). Section 6A(1A) was inserted by regulation 10(1) of the National Health Service (Cross-Border Healthcare) Regulations 2013 (SI 2013/2269).

Section 6B
This section was inserted by regulation 5 of the National Health Service (Reimbursement of the Cost of EEA Treatment) Regulations 2010.

Sections 6BA and 6BB
These sections were inserted by regulation 10(2) of the National Health Service (Cross-Border Healthcare) Regulations 2013.

Section 7
Section 7(4)(a) was repealed by paragraph 13(a) of Schedule 21 to the Health and Social Care Act 2012. Section 7(4)(b) was repealed by paragraph 13(b) of Schedule 21 to the Health and Social Care Act 2012. Sections 7(4)(ba) and (bb) were inserted paragraph 13(c) of Schedule 21 to the Health and Social Care Act 2012. Section 7(4)(fa) was inserted paragraph 13(d) of Schedule 21 to the Health and Social Care Act 2012. Section 7(4)(j) was repealed by paragraph 21 of Schedule 7 to, and paragraph 13(e) of Schedule 21 to, the Health and Social Care Act 2012. Section 7(4)(k) was inserted by paragraph 87 of Schedule 5 to Health and Social Care Act 2008. Section 7(4)(ka) was inserted by paragraph 11 of Schedule 17 to the Health and Social Care Act 2012. Section 7(4)(kb) was inserted by paragraph 10(2) of Schedule 19 to the Health and Social Care Act 2012. Sections 7(4)(na) and (nb) were inserted paragraph 13(f) of Schedule 21 to the Health and Social Care Act 2012.

Section 8A
This section was inserted by paragraph 14 of Schedule 21 to the Health and Social Care Act 2012.

Section 10
Section 10(4)(b) was repealed by paragraph 15 of Schedule 21 to the Health and Social Care Act 2012.

Part 2

Chapter 1

Section 11
Section 11(6) gives effect to Schedule 2.

Section 13
Section 13(3)(a) was repealed by paragraph 16(a) of Schedule 21 to the Health and Social Care Act 2012. Sections 13(3)(aa) and (ab) were inserted by paragraph 16(b) of Schedule 21 to the Health and Social Care Act 2012.

Chapter 2

Section 18
Section 18(4) gives effect to Schedule 3.

Section 21
This section gives effect to Schedule 4.

Chapter 3

Section 22
Section 22(6) was repealed by paragraph 18 of Schedule 21 to the Health and Social Care Act 2012. Section 22(8) gives effect to Schedule 5.

Chapter 4

Sections 25A to 25E
These sections were inserted by section 1(1) of the Nurse Staffing Levels (Wales) Act 2016.

Section 30
Section 30(2)(d) was repealed by paragraph 88(b) of Schedule 5 to, and Part 1 of Schedule 15 to, the Health and Social Care Act 2008. Section 30(2)(e) was repealed by paragraph 22(b) of Schedule 7 to the Health and Social Care Act 2012. Sections 30(2)(f) and (g) were inserted by section 1(3)(c) of the National Health Service (Indemnities) (Wales) Act 2020. Sections 30(8) to (11) were inserted by section 1(8) of the National Health Service (Indemnities) (Wales) Act 2020.

Part 3

Section 32
Section 32(4) was inserted by regulation 245 of the Social Services and Well-being (Wales) Act 2014 (Consequential Amendments) Regulations 2016 (SI 2016/413) (W 131).

Section 35
Section 35(11A) was inserted by regulation 246(b) of the Social Services and Well-being (Wales) Act 2014 (Consequential Amendments) Regulations 2016.

Section 36
Sections 36(3)(a) and (b) were repealed by paragraph 23 of Schedule 21 to the Health and Social Care Act 2012.

Section 40
This section was repealed by paragraph 19 of Schedule 4 to the Well-being of Future Generations (Wales) Act 2015.

Part 4

Section 41
Section 41(4) was repealed by paragraph 26 of Schedule 21 to the Health and Social Care Act 2012.

Part 5

Section 56
Section 56(4) was repealed by paragraph 28 of Schedule 21 to the Health and Social Care Act 2012.

Part 7

Chapter 1

Section 80
Section 80(4A) was inserted by section 220(8) of the Health and Social Care Act 2012. Section 80(4A) was substituted by paragraph 31 of Schedule 5 to the Children and Social Work Act 2017.

Section 82A
This section was inserted by section 111(1) of the Public Health (Wales) Act 2017.

Section 83
Sections 83(2A) to (2C) were inserted by section 112(3) of the Public Health (Wales) Act 2017. Section 83(3A) was inserted by section 112(4) of the Public Health (Wales) Act 2017. Section 83(4)(a) was repealed by section 112(5)(b) of the Public Health (Wales) Act 2017. Section 83(4A) was inserted by section 112(6) of the Public Health (Wales) Act 2017. Sections 83(6)(za), (fa) and (n) were inserted by section 112(7) of the Public Health (Wales) Act 2017. Section 83(6A) was inserted by section 112(8) of the Public Health (Wales) Act 2017. Section 83(10A) was inserted by section 112(9) of the Public Health (Wales) Act 2017.

Section 84
Section 84(4) was inserted by section 112(11) of the Public Health (Wales) Act 2017.

Section 86
Section 86(8)(b) was substituted by paragraph 14(3) of Schedule 4 to the Pharmacy Order 2010 (SI 2010/231). Section 86(9) was repealed by paragraph 11(3)(b) of Schedule 1 to the Pharmacists and Pharmacy Technicians Order 2007 (SI 2007/289).

Section 88
Section 88(5)(b) was repealed by Part 4 of Schedule 15 to the Health and Social Care Act 2008.

Chapter 2

Section 93
This section gives effect to Schedule 6.

Chapter 3
This Chapter consists of section 102, which gives effect to Schedule 7.

Part 8

Chapter 1

Section 106
Section 106(2)(e) was repealed by paragraph 30(a) of Schedule 21 to the Health and Social Care Act 2012. Section 106(2)(f) was inserted by paragraph 30(b) of Schedule 21 to the Health and Social Care Act 2012.

Chapter 1A
This Chapter consists of section 106A. This Chapter is inserted by section 31(1) of the Health Act 2009.

Chapter 2

Section 115
Section 115(1)(e) was repealed by paragraph 31(2)(a) of Schedule 21 to the Health and Social Care Act 2012. Section 115(1)(f) was inserted by paragraph 31(2)(b) of Schedule 21 to the Health and Social Care Act 2012.

Part 9

Section 131
Section 131(a) was substituted by regulation 6 of the National Health Service (Reimbursement of the Cost of EEA Treatment) Regulations 2010.

Part 11

Chapter 6

Section 175
Section 175(1) and (2) were substituted by sections 2(2) and (3) of the National Health Service Finance (Wales) Act 2014. Sections 175(2A), (6A) and (8) were inserted by sections 2(4) to (6) of the National Health Service Finance (Wales) Act 2014.

Section 176
This section was repealed by section 2(7) of the National Health Service Finance (Wales) Act 2014.

Section 177
This section gives effect to Schedule 8.

Section 178
This section gives effect to Schedule 9.

Part 13

Section 192
Section 192(1) was repealed by regulation 248(a) of the Social Services and Well-being (Wales) Act 2014 (Consequential Amendments) Regulations 2016. Section 192(4)(b) was repealed by regulation 248(b) of the Social Services and Well-being (Wales) Act 2014 (Consequential Amendments) Regulations 2016.

Section 194
Section 194(1)(a) was substituted by regulation 249(a) of the Social Services and Well-being (Wales) Act 2014 (Consequential Amendments) Regulations 2016. Section 194(1)(aa) was inserted by regulation 249(b) of the Social Services and Well-being (Wales) Act 2014 (Consequential Amendments) Regulations 2016.

Schedule 8
Paragraphs 1(2)(b) and (c) were repealed by Part 4 of Schedule 15 to the Health and Social Care Act 2008. Paragraph 2(2) was inserted by section 2(9) of the National Health Service Finance (Wales) Act 2014.

Schedule 10
Paragraphs 3(b) and (c) were repealed by paragraph 42(3) of Schedule 21 to the Health and Social Care Act 2012.

Schedule 15
This Schedule was repealed by regulation 250 of the Social Services and Well-being (Wales) Act 2014 (Consequential Amendments) Regulations 2016.

References
Halsbury's Statutes
Hansard
National Health Service (Wales) Act 2006 (C. 42): Table of Origins. HMSO. 2007.

External links
The National Health Service (Wales) Act 2006, as amended from the National Archives.
The National Health Service (Wales) Act 2006, as originally enacted from the National Archives.

United Kingdom Acts of Parliament 2006
Acts of the Parliament of the United Kingdom concerning Wales
2006 in Wales